The Shreveport Mudbugs are a Tier II junior ice hockey team based in Shreveport, Louisiana, as a member of the North American Hockey League. The new Mudbugs replaced a former professional team that played in the area from 1997 to 2011 known as the Bossier-Shreveport Mudbugs.

History
From 1997 to 2000, Shreveport, Louisiana was home to a professional hockey team in the Western Professional Hockey League (WPHL) named the Shreveport Mudbugs. In 2000, the Mudbugs relocated to nearby Bossier City to play out of CenturyTel Center and changed their name to the Bossier-Shreveport Mudbugs. The Mudbugs then joined the Central Hockey League in 2001 when the WPHL merged with the CHL. The professional Mudbugs would eventually fold in 2011 citing low attendance and financial issues even though the team had just won the league championship.

In October 2015, it was announced that a new Mudbugs team would return for the 2016–17 season after signing a 12-year lease agreement with the Louisiana State Fairgrounds and returning to Hirsch Coliseum but as a member of the Tier II junior North American Hockey League. On April 8, 2016, the Shreveport Mudbugs were officially announced as an expansion team in the NAHL. Former Bossier-Shreveport Mudbugs player, Karlis Zirnis, was named the team's first head coach.

In their second season, the Mudbugs finished first in the South Division at the end of the regular season and played their way through the Robertson Cup playoffs to take the NAHL championship in 2018. Following the season, head coach Zirnis left the team to take an assistant coaching position with the University of Alaska-Fairbanks hockey team.

Season-by-season records

References

External links
Shreveport Mudbugs (Official website)

 
2016 establishments in Louisiana
Ice hockey clubs established in 2016